Syncraternis is a genus of moths belonging to the family Tineidae.

Species
Syncraternis anthestias Meyrick, 1922
Syncraternis phaeospila Meyrick, 1922

References

Tineidae
Tineidae genera
Taxa named by Edward Meyrick